Sexual selection is a mode of natural selection in which members of one biological sex choose mates of the other sex to mate with (intersexual selection), and compete with members of the same sex for access to members of the opposite sex (intrasexual selection). These two forms of selection mean that some individuals have greater reproductive success than others within a population, for example because they are more attractive or prefer more attractive partners to produce offspring. Successful males benefit from frequent mating and monopolizing access to one or more fertile females. Females can maximise the return on the energy they invest in reproduction by selecting and mating with the best males.

The concept was first articulated by Charles Darwin who wrote of a "second agency" other than natural selection, in which competition between mate candidates could lead to speciation. The theory was given a mathematical basis by Ronald Fisher in the early 20th century. Sexual selection can lead males to extreme efforts to demonstrate their fitness to be chosen by females, producing sexual dimorphism in secondary sexual characteristics, such as the ornate plumage of birds-of-paradise and peafowl, or the antlers of deer. Depending on the species, these rules can be reversed. This is caused by a positive feedback mechanism known as a Fisherian runaway, where the passing-on of the desire for a trait in one sex is as important as having the trait in the other sex in producing the runaway effect. Although the sexy son hypothesis indicates that females would prefer male offspring, Fisher's principle explains why the sex ratio is most often 1:1. 
Sexual selection is widely distributed in the animal kingdom, and is also found in plants and fungi.

History

Darwin 

Sexual selection was first proposed by Charles Darwin in On the Origin of Species (1859) and developed in The Descent of Man, and Selection in Relation to Sex (1871), as he felt that natural selection alone was unable to account for certain types of non-survival adaptations. He once wrote to a colleague that "The sight of a feather in a peacock's tail, whenever I gaze at it, makes me sick!" His work divided sexual selection into male–male competition and female choice.

These views were to some extent opposed by Alfred Russel Wallace, mostly after Darwin's death. He accepted that sexual selection could occur, but argued that it was a relatively weak form of selection. He argued that male–male competitions were forms of natural selection, but that the "drab" peahen's coloration is itself adaptive as camouflage. In his opinion, ascribing mate choice to females was attributing the ability to judge standards of beauty to animals (such as beetles) far too cognitively undeveloped to be capable of aesthetic feeling.

Darwin's ideas on sexual selection were met with scepticism by his contemporaries and not considered of great importance, until in the 1930s biologists decided to include sexual selection as a mode of natural selection. Only in the 21st century have they become more important in biology; the theory is now seen as generally applicable and analogous to natural selection. A ten-year study, experimentally varying sexual selection on flour beetles with other factors held constant, showed that sexual selection protected even an inbred population against extinction.

Fisherian runaway 

Ronald Fisher, the English statistician and evolutionary biologist, developed his ideas about sexual selection in his 1930 book The Genetical Theory of Natural Selection. These include the sexy son hypothesis, which might suggest a preference for male offspring, and Fisher's principle, which explains why the sex ratio is usually close to 1:1. The Fisherian runaway describes how sexual selection accelerates the preference for a specific ornament, causing the preferred trait and female preference for it to increase together in a positive feedback runaway cycle. He remarked that:

This causes a dramatic increase in both the male's conspicuous feature and in female preference for it, resulting in marked sexual dimorphism, until practical physical constraints halt further exaggeration. A positive feedback loop is created, producing extravagant physical structures in the non-limiting sex. A classic example of female choice and potential runaway selection is the long-tailed widowbird. While males have long tails that are selected for by female choice, female tastes in tail length are still more extreme with females being attracted to tails longer than those that naturally occur. Fisher understood that female preference for long tails may be passed on genetically, in conjunction with genes for the long tail itself. Long-tailed widowbird offspring of both sexes inherit both sets of genes, with females expressing their genetic preference for long tails, and males showing off the coveted long tail itself.

Richard Dawkins presents a non-mathematical explanation of the runaway sexual selection process in his book The Blind Watchmaker. Females that prefer long tailed males tend to have mothers that chose long-tailed fathers. As a result, they carry both sets of genes in their bodies. That is, genes for long tails and for preferring long tails become linked. The taste for long tails and tail length itself may therefore become correlated, tending to increase together. The more tails lengthen, the more long tails are desired. Any slight initial imbalance between taste and tails may set off an explosion in tail lengths. Fisher wrote that:

The female widowbird chooses to mate with the most attractive long-tailed male so that her progeny, if male, will themselves be attractive to females of the next generation—thereby fathering many offspring that carry the female's genes. Since the rate of change in preference is proportional to the average taste amongst females, and as females desire to secure the services of the most sexually attractive males, an additive effect is created that, if unchecked, can yield exponential increases in a given taste and in the corresponding desired sexual attribute.

Since Fisher's initial conceptual model of the 'runaway' process, Russell Lande and Peter O'Donald have provided detailed mathematical proofs that define the circumstances under which runaway sexual selection can take place. Alongside this, biologists have extended Darwin's formulation; Malte Andersson's widely-accepted 1994 definition is that "sexual selection is the differences in reproduction that arise from variation among individuals in traits that affect success in competition over mates and fertilizations". Despite some practical challenges for biologists, the concept of sexual selection is "straightforward".

Modern theory

Reproductive success 

The reproductive success of an organism is measured by the number of offspring left behind, and by their quality or probable fitness. Sexual preference creates a tendency towards assortative mating or homogamy. The general conditions of sexual discrimination appear to be (1) the acceptance of one mate precludes the effective acceptance of alternative mates, and (2) the rejection of an offer is followed by other offers, either certainly or at such high chance that the risk of non-occurrence is smaller than the chance advantage to be gained by selecting a mate. Bateman's principle states that the sex which invests the most in producing offspring becomes a limiting resource for which the other sex competes, illustrated by the greater nutritional investment of an egg in a zygote, and the limited capacity of females to reproduce; for example, in humans, a woman can only give birth every ten months, whereas a male can become a father numerous times in the same period. More recently, researchers have doubted whether Bateman was correct.

Honest signalling 

The handicap principle of Amotz Zahavi, Russell Lande and W. D. Hamilton, holds that the male's survival until and through the age of reproduction with seemingly maladaptive traits is taken by the female as a signal of his overall fitness. Such handicaps might prove he is either free of or resistant to disease, or that he possesses more speed or a greater physical strength that is used to combat the troubles brought on by the exaggerated trait. Zahavi's work spurred a re-examination of the field and several new theories. In 1984, Hamilton and Marlene Zuk introduced the "Bright Male" hypothesis, suggesting that male elaborations might serve as a marker of health, by exaggerating the effects of disease and deficiency.

Male intrasexual competition 

Male–male competition occurs when two males of the same species compete for the opportunity to mate with a female. Sexually dimorphic traits, size, sex ratio, and the social situation may all play a role in the effects male–male competition has on the reproductive success of a male and the mate choice of a female. Larger males tend to win male–male conflicts. Males take many risks in such conflicts, so the value of the resource must be large enough to justify those risks. Winner and loser effects further influence male behaviour. Male–male competition may also affect a female's ability to select the best mates, and therefore decrease the likelihood of successful reproduction.

Multiple models 

More recently, the field has grown to include other areas of study, not all of which fit Darwin's definition of sexual selection. A "bewildering" range of models variously attempt to relate sexual selection not only to the fundamental questions of anisogamy and parental roles, but also to mechanisms such as sex ratios – governed by Fisher's principle, parental care, investing in sexy sons, sexual conflict, and the "most-debated effect", namely mate choice. Elaborated characteristics that might seem costly, like the tail of the Montezuma swordfish (Xiphophorus montezumae), do not always have an energetics, performance or even survival cost; this may be because "compensatory traits" have evolved in concert with the sexually selected traits.

Toolkit of natural selection 

Sexual selection may explain how characteristics such as feathers had survival value at an early stage in their evolution. The earliest proto-birds such as Protarchaeopteryx had well-developed feathers but could not fly. The feathers may have served as insulation, helping females incubate their eggs, but if proto-bird courtship combined displays of forelimb feathers with energetic jumps, then the transition to flight could have been relatively smooth.

Sexual selection may sometimes generate features that help cause a species' extinction, as has been suggested for the giant antlers of the Irish elk (Megaloceros giganteus) that became extinct in Pleistocene Europe. Or it may do the opposite, driving species divergence—sometimes through elaborate changes in genitalia—such that new species emerge.

In different taxa 

Sexual selection is widely distributed among the eukaryotes, occurring in plants, fungi, and animals. Since Darwin's pioneering observations on humans, it has been studied intensively among the insects, spiders, amphibians, scaled reptiles, birds, and mammals, revealing many distinctive behaviours and physical adaptations.

In mammals 

Darwin conjectured that heritable traits such as beards, hairlessness, and steatopygia in different human populations are results of sexual selection in humans. Humans are sexually dimorphic; females select males using factors including voice pitch, facial shape, muscularity, and height.

Among the many instances of sexual selection in mammals is extreme sexual dimorphism, with males as much as six times heavier than females, and male fighting for dominance among elephant seals. Dominant males establish large harems of several dozen females; unsuccessful males may attempt to copulate with a harem male's females if the dominant male is inattentive. This forces the harem male to defend his territory continuously, not feeding for as much as three months.

Also seen in mammals is sex-role reversal, as in the highly social meerkats, where a large female is dominant within a pack, and female–female competition is observed. The dominant female produces most of the offspring; the subordinate females are nonbreeding, providing altruistic care to the young.

In arthropods 

Sexual selection occurs in a wide range of spider species, both before and after copulation. Post-copulatory sexual selection involves sperm competition and cryptic female choice.  Sperm competition occurs where the sperm of more than one male competes to fertilise the egg of the female. Cryptic female choice involves the expelling of a male's sperm during or after copulations.

Many forms of sexual selection exist among the insects. Parental care is often provided by female insects, as in bees, but male parental care is found in belostomatid water bugs, where the male, after fertilizing the eggs, allows the female to glue her eggs onto his back. He broods them until the nymphs hatch 2–4 weeks later. The eggs are large and reduce the ability of the male to fertilise other females and catch prey, and increases its predation risk.

Among the fireflies (Lampyrid beetles), males fly in darkness and emit a species-specific pattern of light flashes, which are answered by perching receptive females. The colour and temporal variation of the flashes contribute to success in attracting females.

In amphibians and reptiles 

Many amphibians have annual breeding seasons with male–male competition. Males arrive at the water's edge first in large numbers, and produce a wide range of vocalizations to attract mates. Among frogs, the fittest males have the deepest croaks and the best territories; females select their mates at least partly based on the depth of croaking. This has led to sexual dimorphism, with females larger than males in 90% of species, and male fighting to access females. Some species, like P. bibronii, are polyandrous, with one female mating with multiple males.

Many different tactics are used by snakes to acquire mates. Ritual combat between males for the females they want to mate with includes topping, a behavior exhibited by most viperids in which one male will twist around the vertically elevated fore body of its opponent and forcing it downward. It is common for neck biting to occur while the snakes are entwined.

In birds 

Birds have evolved a wide variety of mating behaviours and many types of sexual selection. These include intersexual selection (female choice) and intrasexual competition, where individuals of the more abundant sex compete with each other for the privilege to mate. Many species, notably the birds-of-paradise, are sexually dimorphic; the differences such as in size and coloration are energetically costly attributes that signal competitive breeding. Conflicts between an individual's fitness and signalling adaptations ensure that sexually selected ornaments such as coloration of plumage and courtship behaviour are honest traits. Signals must be costly to ensure that only good-quality individuals can present these exaggerated sexual ornaments and behaviours. Males with the brightest plumage are favoured by females of multiple species of bird. 

Many bird species make use of mating calls, the females preferring males with songs that are complex and varied in amplitude, structure, and frequency. Larger males have deeper songs and increased mating success.

In plants and fungi 

Flowering plants have many secondary sexual characteristics subject to sexual selection including floral symmetry if pollinators visit flowers assortatively by degree of symmetry, nectar production, floral structure, and inflorescences, as well as sexual dimorphisms.

Fungi appear to make use of sexual selection, although they also often reproduce asexually. In the Basidiomycetes, the sex ratio is biased towards males, implying sexual selection there. Male–male competition to fertilise occurs in fungi including yeasts. Pheromone signaling is used by female gametes and by conidia, implying male choice in these cases. Female–female competition may also occur, indicated by the much faster evolution of female-biased genes in fungi.

References 

 
Population genetics

sv:Naturligt urval#Sexuellt urval